Randall Lee Rasmussen (born May 10, 1945) is a former American football guard. He played 15 seasons with the New York Jets. He played for the Jets in the 1968 AFL Championship Game victory over the AFL's Oakland Raiders, and started in the third AFL–NFL World Championship Game (Super Bowl III), in which the Jets defeated the NFL's Baltimore Colts.

He was the last of the starting Jets players in the game to retire, playing his final game in the 1981 playoffs against the Buffalo Bills. Rasmussen is one of five professional football players in professional football history who attended the University of Nebraska at Kearney. He was the only one of those five to be selected in the NFL draft.

See also
 List of American Football League players

1945 births
Living people
American football offensive guards
National Football League announcers
New York Jets announcers
New York Jets players
Players of American football from Nebraska
Nebraska–Kearney Lopers football players
American Football League players
People from St. Paul, Nebraska